Jaquith may refer to:

People
 Clarence Jaquith (1896–1993), American track and field athlete
 Cynthia Jaquith, American political candidate; see 2017 Miami mayoral election
 David H. Jaquith, American political candidate; see 1962 New York state election
 Grant C. Jaquith, American judge
 Mark Jaquith, lead developer of WordPress

Other
 Abraham Jaquith House, an historic house in Billerica, Massachusetts
 Dr. Jaquith, a character in Now, Voyager
 Jaquith Pond, a lake in Maine

See also
Jacquith (disambiguation)